Your Song is a musical anthology program broadcast by ABS-CBN in the Philippines.

Year 1

Season 1

Season 2
The May 14, 2006 episode of Your Song was a special screening for Bituing Walang Ningning (see Specials below). It is therefore not listed in this table as a regular episode of this series.

Season 3

Season 4

Year 2

Season 5

Season 6

Season 7

Year 3
As an opening salvo of its third year, there is a new version of Your Song, ABS-CBN's anthology show featuring stories based on chosen love songs. Each story arc will now be shown for a whole month changing parts with Love Spell that'll have a weekly episode.

Season 8

Season 9

Season 10

Year 4

Season 11

Season 12
Starting season twelve, Your Song is featuring artists in several different episodes, which will feature artist acting in different characters. Therefore, each episode will have a different story each week. Each artist will have a minimum of eight episode, although with the high ratings of "Your Song Presents: Kim" it was extended to more than the minimum. Again, Kim Chiu receives high ratings on her "Your Song" episodes, just like the past seasons.

Notes

Lists of anthology television series episodes
Lists of Philippine television series episodes